Ursus maritimus tyrannus is a controversial extinct subspecies of polar bear.

Discovery 
The subspecies was named by the Finnish paleontologist Björn Kurtén in 1964, based of a single fragmentary ulna found in the gravels of the Thames at Kew Bridge, London. The fossil was also discovered alongside steppe bison (Bison priscus). reindeer (Rangifer tarandus) and wolves (Canis lupus).

The specimen is interpreted to represent a relatively large subadult individual. The ulna was dated to the early Weichselian of the Late Pleistocene (~70kya). Of the 16 specimens identified as Pleistocene polar bears, this is the only fossil ascribed under this subspecies.

Controversy 
In 2008, Charles Harington stated that the identification of a polar bear is plausible based on sea level changes and ice conditions in the North Sea of the time period. However, he also noted that Andy Currant of the Natural History Museum, London believes that fossil represents a huge brown bear rather than a polar bear, as fauna; assemblages from other contemporary British sites, also dominated by steppe bison, reindeer and wolves, preserve gigantic brown bears like the Kew Bridge bear.

Andy Currant's opinion that the Kew Bridge fossil belongs to a brown bear, although referenced in a 2007 BBC interview and in studies from 2009 and 2022, awaits official verification.

References

Polar bears
Pleistocene bears
Pleistocene carnivorans
Pleistocene mammals of Europe
Fossils of England
Fossil taxa described in 1964